Raohe may refer to:

Mainland China
Raohe County (饶河县), of Shuangyashan, Heilongjiang
Raohe Town (饶河镇), seat of Raohe County
Po River, or the Rao River (饶河), tributary in Jiangxi of Poyang Lake

Taiwan
Raohe Street Night Market (饒河街觀光夜市), in Songshan District, Taipei